Ilamelmis brunnescens, is a species of riffle beetle found in Sri Lanka.

Description
The beetle is the most abundant species in the genus. It is inhabited under surface of stones in the water current, under pebbles and upon rocks, and stones in the cascade.

References 

Elmidae
Insects of Sri Lanka
Insects described in 1973